The Brotherhood of Saints Cyril and Methodius was a short-lived  secret political society that existed in Kiev (now Kyiv, Ukraine), at the time a part of the Russian Empire.

The organization predated the Spring of Nations in Eastern Europe just by few years. Founded in December, 1845 or in January, 1846, the society sought to revive the ideals of the traditional Ukrainian brotherhoods and envisioned a Ukrainian language revival, including national autonomy within a free and equal Slavic federation. It was quickly suppressed by the government in March 1847 with most of the members punished by internal exile or imprisonment.

The goals of the society were liberalisation of the political and social system of the Imperial Russia in accordance with the members Christian principles and the Slavophile views that gained popularity among the country's liberal intelligents. Created under the initiative of Mykola Kostomarov (1818-1885), a famous historian of Russia and Ukraine, the society was named after Saints Cyril and Methodius, widely regarded as heroes for the Slavic nations celebrated for spreading Christianity  and inventing the Cyrillic alphabet used by multiple Slavic languages.

The society goals included the abolition of serfdom, broad access to public education, transformation of the Russian Empire into a federation of Slavic peoples with the Russians being one among equals rather than the dominant nation. According to Mykhailo Hrushevskyi (1866-1934), the implementation of the liberal democratic principles of freedom of speech, thought and religion.

Members included Panteleimon Kulish (1819-1897), Yurii Andruzky (1827 - after 1864), Vasyl Bilozersky (1825-1899), Mykola Hulak (1821-1899), Opanas Markovych, Oleksander Navrotsky, O. Petrov, Ivan Posiada, Dmytro Pylchykov (1821-1893), and M. Savych. Taras Shevchenko (1814-1861) was arrested because his poems had been found by the secret police among the documents of the participants and he was the champion of the independence of Ukraine, not being the part of federation.

See also
Books of the Genesis of the Ukrainian People
Bratstvo
Saints Cyril and Methodius
Hromada (secret society)
Brotherhood of Tarasovs

References

External links
Cyril and Methodius Brotherhood article in the Encyclopedia of Ukraine of the Canadian Institute of Ukrainian Studies.

 
19th century in Ukraine
History of Kyiv
1845 establishments in the Russian Empire
1847 disestablishments in the Russian Empire
Political history of Ukraine
1847 in politics
Political organizations based in the Russian Empire
Ukrainian nationalism